James Melia or Jimmy Melia may refer to:

James Melia (footballer, born 1874), Sheffield Wednesday, Tottenham Hotspur, Preston North End.
Jimmy Melia (born: 1937), Liverpool, Wolverhampton Wanderers, Southampton, Aldershot.